Chan Yiu Lun (born July 20, 1982 in China) is a former Hong Kong professional footballer and current amateur player for Hong Kong Third Division club Heng Wah. 

Chan is good at managing free-kicks and long passes. In the East Asia Football Championship held in Taipei in 2005, Taiwanese named him as "Hong Kong Beckham" because his free-kick skills are very good.

Club career
Chan started his football career at Sing Tao. He saw Wei Kwan Lung as his idol because his pace and shooting abilities impressed him greatly. Wei Kwan Lung was later banned from football for match-fixing, but he still encouraged Chan to play and not to follow in his footsteps.

Sun Hei 
Chan scored in the extra time of the 2008–09 Hong Kong Senior Challenge Shield semi-final against Fourways Rangers to win the match 1:0 and take Sun Hei to the final.

Rangers
Chan left Rangers on 12 June 2011 after a season in which he was not a regular starter.

Pontic and Double Flower
Chan has reached an understanding to join Pontic for the 2011–12 Hong Kong First Division League season. But in the end, Pontic gave up its promotion due to funding issues and Chan was left with no club to play for. Therefore, he could only play for Double Flower in the Second Division and waited to see if any opportunities would come up in the 2011–12 season.

Sun Hei
On 11 January 2012, Chan returned to his former club Sun Hei because head coach Ricardo was in need of more players due to the suspension of Kilama and Milovanovic following the match against Pegasus, when both were sent off and therefore suspended.

Honours
Sun Hei
Hong Kong FA Cup: 2005–06

Career statistics

Club career

International career
As of 22 December 2009

Notes and references

External links
Chan Yiu Lun at HKFA
Profile at convoysunhei.hk 

1982 births
Living people
Hong Kong footballers
Association football midfielders
Hong Kong Rangers FC players
Kitchee SC players
Sun Hei SC players
Hong Kong First Division League players
Fourway Athletics players
Double Flower FA players
Hong Kong international footballers
Footballers at the 2002 Asian Games
Asian Games competitors for Hong Kong
Hong Kong League XI representative players